Jahrome Hughes (born 8 October 1994) is a New Zealand professional rugby league footballer who plays as a  for the Melbourne Storm in the NRL, and the New Zealand Māori and New Zealand at international level. He is a NRL premiership winning player of 2020.

He previously played for the Gold Coast Titans and the North Queensland Cowboys in the National Rugby League, and played as a  earlier in his career.

Early life
Hughes was born in Wellington, New Zealand, and is of Māori, and Welsh descent.

He played junior rugby league for the Harbour City Eagles.

In 2008, Hughes moved to the Gold Coast, where he played for the Tugun Seahawks and Currumbin Eagles. He was educated at Palm Beach Currumbin State High School.

Playing career

Early career
Hughes played for the Sydney Roosters SG Ball Cup team before being signed by the Gold Coast Titans in 2012. He played for the Gold Coast NYC team from 2012 to 2014.

2013–2014: Gold Coast Titans
In Round 17 of the 2013 NRL season, Hughes made his NRL debut for the Gold Coast Titans against Penrith at Darwin. In 2014, he spent the season in the NYC and was released by the Gold Coast at the end of the year.

2015
Hughes joined the new Queensland Cup side, the Townsville Blackhawks. In September, he was named at fullback in the 2015 Queensland Cup Team of the Year. Hughes was named Blackhawks' Best Back and Players' Player.

In October, Hughes signed a one-year contract with North Queensland.

2016: North Queensland Cowboys
On 8 May, Hughes represented the Queensland Residents against the New South Wales Residents, playing at fullback and scoring a try in the 16-30 win. In Round 12, Hughes made his North Queensland debut in Wollongong, scoring a try in the 10–14 loss to St. George Illawarra. On 30 June, he signed a two-year contract with Melbourne starting in 2017.

On 3 September, Hughes was named in the Queensland Cup Team of the Year at fullback for the second straight year.

2017–present: Melbourne Storm

In round 16 of the 2017 season, Hughes made his Melbourne Storm debut against the Sydney Roosters at Adelaide on 24 June, becoming Melbourne player 184. Hughes earned selection for the New Zealand national rugby league team at the end of the 2018 season, but did not make the run-on team.

After the retirement of Billy Slater and injury to Scott Drinkwater, Hughes began the 2019 season playing . Following consistent performances for the Storm, Hughes made his international debut for New Zealand Kiwis against Tonga. He scored a try on debut and played off the bench.

Hughes would remain there for the remaining games of the 2019 season, scoring a try in the finals series however the Storm would lose in the preliminary finals to 2018 grand final opponent, the Sydney Roosters in a tight game 14-6.

Hughes would make the permanent move into the halves in 2020 usually partnering Cameron Munster, but occasionally partnering with Cameron Smith. This transition would prove successful with Hughes starting at halfback in Melbourne's 26–20 2020 NRL Grand Final over Penrith.

Hughes would cap a personally successful 2021 season by being awarded the Melbourne Storm Player of the Year award, also being crowned as the 2021 Kiwi Player of the Year. He would also fill in as Melbourne Storm captain for the first time in 2022, re-signing with the club until the end of the 2026 NRL season.

In 2022, Hughes started at halfback for the first time in his fourth test match representing New Zealand Kiwis. Hughes would score the opening try in the Kiwis 26–6 win against Tonga.

Achievements and accolades

Individual
Queensland Cup Team of the Year: 2015, 2016
New Zealand International: 2019

Melbourne Storm

  Premiers: 2020
 Spirit of ANZAC Medal: 2021
 Melbourne Storm Player of the Year: 2021

Statistics

NRL
 Statistics are correct to the end of the 2022 NRL Season.

References

External links
Melbourne Storm profile
Townsville Blackhawks profile

1994 births
Living people
Gold Coast Titans players
Melbourne Storm players
New Zealand emigrants to Australia
New Zealand Māori rugby league players
New Zealand Māori rugby league team players
New Zealand national rugby league team players
New Zealand people of Welsh descent
New Zealand rugby league players
North Queensland Cowboys players
Rugby league fullbacks
Rugby league players from Wellington City
Townsville Blackhawks players
Sunshine Coast Falcons players